William Thomas Robertson  (2 February 1917 – 2 January 2011) was the fourth Director-General of the Australian Secret Intelligence Service (ASIS), from 1968 until 1975, when was dismissed by Prime Minister Gough Whitlam; the reasons for Roberton's dismissal have remained a matter of controversy. 

During World War II, Robertson served as an Australian Army officer. He served as an infantry officer in North Africa, where he was wounded in action, and in Greece, before being appointed to staff roles in New Guinea. During 1944–45, he was attached to the British Army in North West Europe and held senior staff roles with two different British divisions.

In 1952, Robertson was a founding member of the ASIS; its existence was to remain officially secret for two and a half decades.

Early life 
Robertson was born in Melbourne on 2 February 1917.

Military service 
On 15 November 1939, Robertson joined the Australian Imperial Force (service number VX213), thus volunteering for service overseas with the Australian Army. With the rank of Captain, he served in the 2/8th Infantry Battalion, part of the 6th Division and was wounded during the capture of Tobruk from Italian forces.  Robertson also served with the 6th Division in Greece, fighting German forces. 

From 1942, during the New Guinea campaign, Robertson – promoted to the rank of Lieutenant Colonel – was appointed to staff roles. As a liaison officer with US Army formations, he inspected the Allied perimeter at Buna; Robertson was dissatisfied with what he saw, and made observations critical of US Army units  to Australian General Edmund Herring and US General Richard K. Sutherland. As a result, Douglas MacArthur made changes to the US Army staff at Buna.

In August 1943, Robertson was appointed to the position of GSO1 (senior operations officer), assisting the commanding officer of the 7th Division, George Vasey. During the Salamaua-Lae campaign, Vasey sent Robertson to Port Moresby, in a bid to improve cooperation with US ground and air forces; both General George Kenney (USAAF) and General Frank Berryman (Australian Army), were said to have found Robertson's approach "surprising", although Robertson later wrote to Vasey that he had succeeded in the task assigned to him. Exploiting intelligence gained from the capture of Imperial Japanese Army documents, Robertson played a key role in battles such as Kaiaipit and Dumpu.

In early 1944, Robertson was posted to Britain, where he was GSO1 with the British 51st (Highland) Infantry Division, as it prepared for the invasion of Europe. During the Normandy campaign, he was GSO1 of the British 50th (Northumbrian) Infantry Division.

Intelligence career

Dismissal as Director-General

On becoming informed of a CIA operation in Chile in February 1973 which involved ASIS, the then Labor Prime Minister Gough Whitlam signed a document ordering the closure of ASIS operations in Chile. It appears, however, that ASIS agents did not leave Chile until October 1973, after the 1973 Chilean coup d'état had brought down the Allende Government. Whitlam accused Robertson of disobeying instructions by delaying the closure of the ASIS station in Chile. 

In the lead up to Indonesia’s invasion of East Timor in 1975, ASIS paid a Dili-based Australian businessman Frank Favaro for information on local political developments. The leaking of his identity in late 1975 led to another confrontation between Whitlam and Robertson.

These incidents led to Whitlam sacking Robertson on 21 October 1975, with effect on 7 November, just 4 days before Whitlam's own dismissal in the 1975 Australian constitutional crisis, although Robertson disputes the reason for his dismissal in documents lodged with the National Archives in 2009.

References

Bibliography

External links
Martin Ferguson, Australian Minister for Resources and Energy, Minister for Tourism, Acting Minister for Foreign Affairs
WW2 Nominal Roll
Obituary, Sydney Morning Herald

1917 births
2011 deaths
Military personnel from Melbourne
Australian Army officers
Australian Army personnel of World War II
Australian Commanders of the Order of the British Empire
Directors-General of the Australian Secret Intelligence Service
Australian recipients of the Military Cross